S E A Holdings Limited, also known as SEA Group is a company listed on the Stock Exchange of Hong Kong. The Group's core business is property investment and development, as well as hotel operation, with diversified business over Hong Kong, United Kingdom, Australia and other countries.

Background 
SEA Group was founded in Hong Kong in 1956, its subsidiary went public in 1973 and redomiciled to Bermuda in 1989. S E A Holdings Limited became the listed flagship company of the Group.

Over the years, the Group has over 200 residential, commercial and industrial projects in Hong Kong, United Kingdom, Australia, New Zealand, Canada and Mainland China, etc. The Group has since become an international property conglomerate.

Core business 
The Group's core business include investment holding, property investment and development, hotel operation as well as asset management.

Existing & past development 
The Group has invested and developed over 200 residential, commercial and industrial projects in China, Hong Kong, United Kingdom, Canada, Australia, New Zealand, Japan, Indonesia and other countries. The main projects are shown as below:

^Existing Development

Shareholders
The controlling shareholder of the listed company is Lu family. In 2018, it was reported that Lu family restructured the group structure by changing the parent companies of the listed company. After the restructure, 51.23% shares of the listed company were still owned by Nan Luen International Limited, a private company owned by the Executive Chairman of S E A Holdings, Lu Wing-chi and CEO, Lambert Lu. As of 2018, Lu Wing-chi also individually owned an additional 11.33% shares of the listed company. Lu Wing-chi is the father of Lambert Lu.

References

External links 
 

Companies listed on the Hong Kong Stock Exchange
Land developers of Hong Kong
Family-owned companies of Hong Kong
Offshore companies of Bermuda